Lepidesmia is a genus of flowering plants in the family Asteraceae.

 Species
 Lepidesmia squarrosa Klatt – Cuba, Venezuela
 Lepidesmia taraxacoides Källor

References

Asteraceae genera
Eupatorieae